Pingalshi Meghanand Gadhvi (27 July 1914 – 31 May 1998) was an Indian folk singer and Gujarati folk writer ( Sahithyakar ) from Gujarat.

Biography
Gadhvi was born on 27 July 1914 in Chhatrava village near Junagadh. He had a little formal education. He wrote folk literature in various genres and was featured regularly on Gujarati television channels and radio shows. He died on 31 May 1998 in Jamnagar in Gujarat.

He wrote Khamirvanta Manavi (1972), Chanda darshan (1991), Venudada (1978), Gandhikula (1969, about the ancestors of Mahatma Gandhi and some songs), Khamirvanti Kathao (1996), Bhavni Bhet (1998), Baharvatiyo Bhupat (1978), Jivatarna Jokh (1996), Mrutyuno Malkat (1996, short stories).

Saurashtra: Satyam Shivam Sundaram (2000) was published by his son Laxman in his honour.

Recognition
Gadhvi received the Sangeet Natak Akademi award in 1990 for his contribution to the Gujarati folk music.

See also
 List of Gujarati-language writers

References

1914 births
1998 deaths
Indian folk singers
Gujarati-language writers
People from Porbandar district
Indian folklorists
Indian male writers

Charan
Gadhavi (surname)